The Law Society of Singapore is an organisation which represents all lawyers in Singapore. It publishes the Law Gazette and operates a scheme for needy people to benefit from legal services free-of-charge and to ensure access to justice for those who may not be able to afford it. The Society also sets out rules for how lawyers should advertise. The Law Society is analogous to what is called the Bar Association in many countries and should not be confused with the Singapore Academy of Law.

The society motto is "An Advocate for the Profession, An Advocate for the Community."

Leadership

See also
Law society

References

External links

Law Society of Singapore website

Singapore
Legal organisations based in Singapore